Onthophagus nigriventris is a species of dung beetle in the family Scarabaeidae.

References

Further reading

External links

 

Scarabaeinae
Beetles described in 1902